Black Moshannon may refer to the following locations in Pennsylvania:

Black Moshannon Creek, a tributary of Moshannon Creek
Black Moshannon Lake, a lake in Centre County
Black Moshannon State Park, a state park in Centre County
Black Moshannon Observatory, a defunct astronomical observatory

See also
Moshannon (disambiguation)